Dunmore Lang College is a residential college of Macquarie University in Sydney, Australia. Its motto is "Enriching students’ lives; creating futures".

The college is a non-profit organisation, affiliated with the university. Established in 1972, it was named after John Dunmore Lang, a controversial Presbyterian clergyman who arrived in Australia in 1823.

An influential figure in the early history of the college was Miss Dorothy Knox, Principal of the Presbyterian Ladies' College, Pymble, who guided community appeals for suitable accommodation for ladies. Since a site at the University of Sydney could not be found, attention turned to the then new Macquarie University.

Originally a ladies college, Dunmore Lang College soon became co-educational and in recent years a new wing was created expanding the college to accommodate about 260 students and new conference facilities. The college is fully catered and provides rooms with and without ensuites.

Dunmore Lang College is governed by a board of directors.

Facilities
There are three common rooms in the college, one for general students with cable television, pool table, table tennis and couches, one common room is dedicated to senior students and one for postgraduate students. It is also utilized by the whole college when the main common room is being used by the colleges conference clients. The college also has its own library. There is also a room dedicated to Chiropractic study with a Chiropractic bed.

Conference Centre
Their modern Conference Centre offers a one-stop planning service to meet your event needs. Whether you're hosting an exciting workshop or summer retreat our facilities include a variety of meeting spaces and sleeping rooms that can accommodate groups as small as 10 and as large as 250.

The Conference Centre at Dunmore Lang offers:
4 spacious air-conditioned meeting rooms
Foyer with space for up to 110 guests
Personalised, one-stop planning services
Modern audio-visual equipment
A variety of catering options, customised to fit your budget
Ample free parking
Wi-Fi available in all meeting spaces
Air-conditioned study rooms and overnight accommodation available during university breaks
Spacious and green outdoor areas

Visit their website:

Student association
The college's student association is known as the ADS, which is affiliated with SAM (Students at Macquarie). They organise a variety of events throughout the year, including O-week and Dis-o-week activities and the annual pre-Conception Day party. Conception Day is an annual event at Macquarie University, a day music festival that commemorates the conception of Governor Macquarie.

The ADS also organises the annual sporting competition and debating competition against its neighbour and friendly rival Robert Menzies College

Staff
Alasdair Murrie-West is the Principal of Dunmore Lang College. The college employs 14 Resident Advisers to provide 24-hour student pastoral care. A variety of Resident Tutors are also employed to provide academic assistance.

Sources

 D.W.A. Baker (1998). Preacher, Politician, Patriot: The Life of John Dunmore Lang. . (240pp)
 B.A. Zuiddam (2006). Trouble in the Colonies, John Dunmore Lang: Troublemaker or Troubleshooter, Acta Theologica, Bloemfontein, South Africa.

Residential colleges of Macquarie University
Educational institutions established in 1972